The Red Dog Saloon is a drinking establishment at 278 South Franklin Street in Juneau, Alaska, U.S. The Red Dog has been recognized by the Alaska Legislature for its longevity as the oldest man-made tourist attraction in Juneau.

History
Founded during Juneau's mining era, the Saloon has been in operation for decades. For a time, "Ragtime Hattie" played the piano in white gloves and a silver dollar halter top. Later, in territorial days, the owners would often meet the tour boats at the docks with a mule that wore a sign saying, "follow my ass to the Red Dog Saloon." 

The saloon hosted an episode of The Ed Sullivan Show just after Alaska became a state.

Memorabilia displayed

 Wyatt Earp's gun that he checked but failed to claim on his way to Nome
 a walrus oosik
 trophy wildlife mounts
 paper currency signed by miners from around the world throughout the years
Established by Earl and Thelma Forsythe

References

External links
 

Buildings and structures in Juneau, Alaska
Companies based in Juneau, Alaska
Culture of Juneau, Alaska
Drinking establishments in Alaska
Pre-statehood history of Alaska
Tourist attractions in Juneau, Alaska